An iceman is someone who sells or delivers ice from a wagon, cart, or motor-truck. 

The profession was formerly much more common than it is today. From the late 19th century to mid-20th century, in cities and towns icemen would commonly make daily rounds delivering ice for iceboxes before the electric domestic refrigerator became commonplace.

Many icemen in the Northeastern U.S. had origins in Southern Italy. Arriving in the U.S. with little education or trade skills, many of these immigrants began ice routes, especially in New York City, where ice routes were a common sight. In those times, ice was harvested from ponds and lakes, stored in ice houses and transported to cities. Modern day icemen no longer use a wagon or cart to deliver their ice, but instead use freezer trucks which contain pallets stacked with bags of ice cubes and large blocks (known as cakes) of ice.  Many of the old-fashioned small-time routes were bought out in the 1980s and 1990s by large ice corporations that produce and sell ice as well as ice machines for restaurants and bars. 

The tools of the iceman were wires (to tie the bags of cubes), hooks, tongs, and ice picks. Being an iceman was arduous. Icemen usually began their day at 4:00 am and finished late in the evening, depending on both the season and day of the week. Many icemen worked seven days a week and through holidays.

As Arthur Miller recalls in his autobiography Timebends, "icemen had leather vests and a wet piece of sackcloth slung over the right shoulder, and once they had slid the ice into the box, they invariably slipped the sacking off and stood there waiting, dripping, for their money."

The occupation of ice delivery lives on through Amish communities, where ice is commonly delivered by truck and used to cool food and other perishables.

See also
Ice trade
Ice cutting

Notes
 Arthur Miller, Timebends: A Life (New York, Harper & Row, 1987), 64.

Bibliography
 Joseph C. Jones, J.R.: America's Icemen: An Illustrative History of the United States Natural Ice Industry 1665-1925. Humble, TX: Jobeco Books 1984. 

Obsolete occupations
Water ice